Joel Jaffe (born January 15, 1952), also known as J. Jaffe, is an American audio engineer, record producer, multi-instrumentalist, songwriter, and president and co-founder of Studio D Recording, Inc.

Jaffe has worked with artists including Huey Lewis and the News, Ringo Starr, Buddy Greco, Melissa Etheridge, The Stylistics, Eddie Money, Santana, and Bonnie Raitt.

Early life
Joel Jaffe was born in Cleveland, Ohio, United States, to Jay and Dorothy (Née Watkins) Jaffe. He began taking piano lessons from his mother at age six, as well as studying classical and jazz piano with other instructors. He began taking guitar lessons at age twelve after seeing The Beatles perform on The Ed Sullivan Show. In high school he formed the band The Illusions, performing at dances and parties, then at nightclubs opening shows for such artists as The Four Tops, The Everly Brothers, and The O'Jays.

Selected discography

References

External links

1952 births
Living people
People from the San Francisco Bay Area
Music of the San Francisco Bay Area
Record producers from Ohio
American audio engineers